The 2022 Singa Championship Series was a Twenty20 International (T20I) cricket series between the men's national teams of Singapore and Papua New Guinea which took place in Singapore in July 2022. Singapore came into the series after losing the 2022 Stan Nagaiah Trophy series to Malaysia two days earlier. The series provided both teams with preparation for the 2022 ICC Men's T20 World Cup Global Qualifier B tournament.

Squads

T20I series

1st T20I

2nd T20I

3rd T20I

References

External links
 Series home at ESPNcricinfo

Associate international cricket competitions in 2022
2022 in Papua New Guinean cricket
Singa Championship Series